The 1952 Pacific typhoon season had no official bounds, but most tropical cyclones tend to form in the northwestern Pacific Ocean between June and December. These dates conventionally delimit the period of each year when most tropical cyclones form in the northwestern Pacific Ocean.

The scope of this article is limited to the Pacific Ocean, north of the equator and west of the international date line. Storms that form east of the date line and north of the equator are called hurricanes; see 1952 Pacific hurricane season. Tropical Storms formed in the entire west Pacific basin were assigned a name by the Fleet Weather Center on Guam.

Season summary

Systems

Typhoon Charlotte 

Typhoon Charlotte formed on June 10, near the Philippines. It then strengthened and made landfall as a minimal typhoon near Hong Kong before dissipating on June 15.

Typhoon Dinah 

On June 23, Dinah struck to the west of the Kanto Region in Japan. 65 people were killed and 70 were missing.

Typhoon Emma 

Typhoon Emma hit the Philippines and South China, especially Hainan Island.

Tropical Storm Freda 

Freda weakened to a tropical depression before hitting Kyushu.

Tropical Storm Gilda 
Tropical Storm Gilda hit China as a tropical storm.

Typhoon Harriet 

Tropical Storm Ivy

Tropical Storm Jeanne

Typhoon Karen 
Typhoon Karen struck land, mostly Korea and Japan.

Typhoon Lois

Typhoon Mary

Typhoon Nona

Tropical Storm 12W

Typhoon Olive 

Typhoon Olive was one of the strongest typhoons of the 1952 Pacific Typhoon Season. It caused no deaths but still had significant effects on Wake Island and caused 4 injuries as well as costing > 1.6 million dollars in damages.

Tropical Storm 14W

Typhoon Polly

Typhoon Rose

Tropical Storm Shirley 
Shirley tracked through Vietnam. Shirley weakened to a tropical depression before hitting Vietnam.

Typhoon Trix 

Typhoon Trix was a deadly typhoon that struck the Philippines as a Category 3 typhoon. It struck the Bicol region, killing 995 people.

Typhoon Vae 

After striking Vietnam, Vae crossed over to the North Indian Ocean before dissipating.

Typhoon Wilma 

On October 26, ten people were lost when a USAF WB-29 disappeared during a flight into Super Typhoon Wilma.

Typhoon Agnes

Typhoon Bess

Typhoon Carmen

Typhoon Della

Typhoon Elaine

Typhoon Faye

Typhoon Gloria

Typhoon Hester 

Typhoon Hester remained in the open sea. Despite this, Enewetak Atoll experienced severe flooding..

Storm names

See also 

 1952 Pacific hurricane season
 1952 Atlantic hurricane season
 1952 North Indian Ocean cyclone season
 Australian region cyclone seasons: 1951–52 1952–53
 South Pacific cyclone seasons: 1951–52 1952–53
 South-West Indian Ocean cyclone seasons: 1951–52 1952–53

References 

 
Pacific typhoon seasons